International Superstar Soccer 2 is a football video game in the International Superstar Soccer series by Konami. Unlike other football games by Konami it only features international teams. Initially being released on the GameCube, it became possible to play the game on a Wii also, introducing the game to a new generation of players, as with every original Gamecube game. Goals could come from a variety of sources; crosses, corners, penalties, free kicks, passing plays, solo runs, lobbed efforts and long range drives. The game continued the trend of having player's with different attributes, both visually and with regards to their style on the pitch; pacey wingers out wide, large target men up front, shorter centre forwards trying to cause problems for defenders with their skill running on the ball.

Reception

On release, Famitsu magazine scored the first PlayStation 2 version of the game a 33 out of 40. Cubed3 gave the Gamecube version a 7 out of 10, criticising poor AI on the highest level as well as removal of RPG feature and Scenario mode. GamersHell gave it 7.7 out of 10, criticising the games' manual.

References

2002 video games
Europe-exclusive video games
International Superstar Soccer
GameCube games
PlayStation 2 games
Video games developed in Japan
Xbox games